Ernie Collins may refer to:

Ernie Collins (musician) on Temptation (Shelby Lynne album)
Ernie Collins, character in 3:10 to Yuma (1957 film)
Ernest Collins (actor) in The Chance of a Lifetime (1916 film)
Ernest Collins (1851–1914), British water engineer

See also
Earnest Collins, college football coach
Ernest Collinge, English footballer